Gary Edward Daniels (born 9 May 1963) is an English actor, producer, martial artist, fight coordinator and former world light heavyweight kickboxing champion. Born and raised in London, England, Daniels started to take martial arts lessons at the age of eight. By his late teens, he became a competitive kickboxer. In 1980, Daniels moved to the United States to continue the sport. In 1990, he won the WKBA California State Light Heavyweight Championship and the PKA World Light Heavyweight Championship.

Daniels is also an action film leading man, starting with Final Reprisal (1988) and The Secret of King Mahis Island (1988). He followed up with Capital Punishment (1991), American Streetfighter (1992), Deadly Target (1994), Fist of the North Star (1995), Bloodmoon (1996), Recoil,(1997), Spoiler (1998), Misfire (2014), Skin Traffik (2015), etc. He also plays supporting roles; some of these credits are City Hunter (1993), The Legend of Bruce Lee (2008), Tekken, (2009), The Expendables (2010), I Am Vengeance (2018), Kung Fu (2021), etc.

Early life

Gary Daniels was born in London, England, on 9 May 1963. Daniels said that at the age of eight he was inspired to learn martial arts after seeing the trailer of the Bruce Lee film Enter the Dragon. Following this, Daniels said he joined a kung-fu school for three to four years, after he made the switch to taekwondo where he received a black belt in his mid-teens. He became a 2nd dan and began competing in ITF taekwondo tournaments. His aggressive style did not sit well with British officials, however, and he lost 3 fights by disqualification.

Career

1979-1995: Kickboxing career to action film leading man 
Daniels began kickboxing at the age of seventeen under the tutelage of former British Army boxing champion Mickey Byrne. He debuted in 1979, and compiled a record of 13 victories (13 knockouts) and 3 defeats. Daniels early matches in England and in the United States were amateur matches.

In 1980, Daniels decided to leave England and move to the state of Florida in the United States to continue his career.

Daniels had an amateur kickboxing record of 31 wins, 30 by knockout and 4 defeats.

By the late 1980s, Daniels moved to California and began practicing Muay Thai at Benny Urquidez's Jet Center and Yuki Horiuchi's Piston Kickboxing Gym. He also became a professional kickboxer.

In 1988, Daniels starred in the action films Final Reprisal, and The Secret of King Mahis Island. According to Daniels, a talent agent introduced him to a production company in the Philippines, with whom he made them.

In November 1990, Daniels won the WKBA California State Light Heavyweight Championship and the PKA World Light Heavyweight Championship in England within the space of a month.

In 1991, Daniels acted in Ring of Fire, and starred in Capital Punishment. On 3 December in Birmingham, England, Daniels fought a 3-round, No Decision, exhibition match with 11-time World Kickboxing Champion Don "The Dragon" Wilson at the World Martial Arts Extravaganza. Daniels retired with an undefeated professional kickboxing record of 4-0-0 with 2 knockouts.

In 1992, Daniels acted in Final Impact, Deadly Bet, and Bloodfist IV: Die Trying. Also that year, he starred in American Streetfighter.

In 1993, Daniels acted in Wong Jing's film adaptation of City Hunter starring Jackie Chan, a significant early role for Daniels. Daniels also acted in Albert Pyun's Knights. Daniels said that he was offered the role of one of the villains in City Hunter while filming Knights in Utah, however shooting days overlapped. He went on to ask director Albert Pyun if he could finish his shooting schedule earlier to join the Jackie Chan film in Hong-Kong. Pyun accepted but had to reduce a few of his scenes and use a double. Daniels said he arrived late on the set and the introductory scene of the villains was already shot. He thinks it played to his advantage because the filmmakers edited in parallel a scene of him training and showing his physical prowess to introduce his character. That year, he starred in Full Impact, and co-starred with Chad McQueen in Firepower  

In 1994, he starred in Deadly Target.

In 1995, Daniels starred in Fist of the North Star, which offered a notable boost to his career, particulary due to the film's successful home video release in Asian markets. That same year, he would star in White Tiger, and had a role in the movie Heatseeker.

In mid-to-late 1990s, Daniels found a niche as lead actor in many of PM Entertainment's action movies, including 1995's Rage,1996's Riot and 1998's Recoil.

1996-2009: Subsequent films 
In 1996, Daniels acted in Bloodmoon, Hawk's Vengeance,.

In 1998, he starred No Tomorrow, Spoiler, and Cold Harvest.

In 1999, Daniels acted an the episode television show Sons of Thunder, and the film Delta Force One: The Lost Patrol.

In 2000, Daniels starred in Black Friday, Fatal Blade, and City of Fear.

In 2001, he starred Epicenter, Queen's Messenger, and Witness to a Kill.

In 2004 Daniels acted in Retrograde.

In 2005, Daniels acted in Submerged.

In 2008, he played the role of Ed Parker in biographical mini series The Legend of Bruce Lee. Also, Daniels made a one-fight comeback in Thailand at the age of 45 and he lost by decision after 5 rounds. That year, he acted in Dark Secrets, Cold Earth, and Kiss of the Vampire.

In 2009 he acted in La Linea, and played the character Bryan Fury in the video game adaptation Tekken.

2010 to present day: Current roles 
In 2010, Daniels played a supporting role in The Expendables.  Also in 2010, Daniels  acted in Hunt to Kill, The Lazarus Papers, and Across the Line: The Exodus of Charlie Wright.

In 2011, he acted in Game of Death and Johnny's Gone. 

In 2012, Daniels acted in The Encounter: Paradise Lost, The Mark, and Santa's Summer House. That year he starred in Forced to Fight.

In 2013, Daniels acted in The Mark 2: Redemption, Payday 2, and A Stranger in Paradise.

In 2014, he returned to the role of Bryan Fury in Tekken 2: Kazuya's Revenge. Also that year, he played the lead in Misfire.

In 2015 he acted in Zero Tolerance, and Dancin': It's On!. That year, he played the lead in Skin Traffik. 

In 2016, he acted in The Wrong Child, and starred in Rumble.

In 2018, he acted in I Am Vengeance, and Astro. 

In 2021, he acted an episode of Kung Fu.

Martial arts and fitness 
Daniels studied Muay Thai, kickboxing, taekwondo, boxing, ninjitsu, and Northern Shaolin kung fu. In his films, he employs a mixed martial arts style, leading with strong, sweeping kicks and sometimes engaging in close quarters fights with complex hand to hand choreography.

Daniels said his main discipline is Siu Lum Wong Gar Kune (Shaolin Wong Family Fist), and studies with Sifu Winston Omega.

Titles
Professional Karate Association
PKA World Light Heavyweight Championship
World Kick Boxing Association
WKBA California State Light Heavyweight Championship

Filmography

Film

Television

Video games

Professional kickboxing record

References

Further reading 

Combat, January 1992. Front-page story: Gary Daniels the best of British!. Volume: 18. Number: 1.
Combat, April 1992. Front-page story: Gary Daniels! Fight for your life. Volume: 18. Number: 4.
Inside Karate, July 1992. Front-page story: Gary Daniels British kickboxing champ is box office gold.
Martial Arts Illustrated, January 1993. Front-page story: True Brit. Volume: 5. Number: 8.
Inside Kung-Fu presents kickboxing sport of the 90s, August 1993. Front-page story: His game is foot! Gary Daniels trades the ring for the reel thing.
Impact, July 1994. Front-page story: Gary Daniels in Deadly Target.
Inside Tae Kwon Do, November 1994. Front-page story: How To Finish With a Kick. Volume: 3. Number: 6.
Martial Arts Movies, December 1994. Front-page story: Brit Gary Daniels stars as Japan's biggest cult hero.
Impact, May 1995. Front-page story: Manga movie mania.
Impact, October 1996. Front-page story: Fist of the North Star.
Combat, October 1995. Front-page story: Gary Daniels the Heatseeker!. Volume: 21. Number: 10.
Martial Arts Illustrated, December1995. Front-page story: Exclusive Gary Daniels enter the white tiger. Volume: 8. Number: 7.
Combat, August 1996. Front-page story: Gary Daniels west beats east. Volume: 22. Number: 8.
Martial Arts Illustrated, August 1996. Front-page story: Gary Daniels at the 'Clash' spectacular success. Volume: 9. Number: 8.
Martial Arts Illustrated, January 1997. Front-page story: Gary Daniels exclusive. Volume: 9. Number: 8.
Tae Kwon Do and Korean Combat Arts, February and March 1996. Front-page story: Gary Daniels Fist of the North Star. Volume: 1. Number: 3
Budo Journal, March 1998. Front-page story: Gary Daniels.
Martial Arts Illustrated, April, 1998. Front-page story: Mai talks with action stars Gary Daniels & Kevin Brewerton. Volume: 10. Number: 11.
Martial Arts Illustrated, December 1998. Front-page story: Gary Daniels movies, training, and more! Volume: 1. Number: 5.
Rock! Schock! Pop!, 19 December 2012. Jane, Ian: Forced To Speak! An Interview With Gary Daniels At Rock! Shock! Pop!
Martial Arts Illustrated, November 2013. Front-page story: Gary Daniels talks action cinema. Volume: 26. Number: 6.

External links

 
 

Living people
1963 births
English male kickboxers
Middleweight kickboxers
Light heavyweight kickboxers
English male taekwondo practitioners
English male film actors
English male television actors
Male actors from London
20th-century English male actors
21st-century English male actors